Carmen Madrid is a Mexican actress and writer, best known for her role Clara in the film Nicotina, role for which she has nomined for the Ariel Award for Best Actress. Although she is mostly known for her roles in telenovelas. Recently she played Silvia Pinal, in the biographical drama series about Alejandra Guzmán, La Guzmán.

Selected filmography

As writer

Film roles

Television roles

References

External links 
 

21st-century Mexican actresses
20th-century Mexican actresses
Living people
Mexican telenovela actresses
Mexican television actresses
Mexican writers
Year of birth missing (living people)